Tomi Mäki (born August 19, 1983) is a Finnish professional ice hockey forward who is currently an unrestricted free agent. He most recently played for Jokerit in the Kontinental Hockey League (KHL).

Playing career
Mäki was drafted by the Calgary Flames as their fourth-round pick, 108th overall, in the 2001 NHL Entry Draft. Prior to being drafted he played four seasons with Jokerit in the Finnish SM-liiga.

Mäki then spent three years in the Flames system with the Omaha Ak-Sar-Ben Knights and the Quad City Flames of the AHL. During this time Mäki made his first and only NHL appearance with the Calgary Flames on December 12, 2006 against the Minnesota Wild going scoreless.

On April 21, 2008, Mäki returned to his old club, signing for Jokerit of the then SM-Liiga. In remaining with Jokerit through their transition to the KHL, Mäki as the club's longest tenured player, extended his contract following the 2017–18 season, agreeing to a one-year deal on April 9, 2018.

Career statistics

Regular season and playoffs

International

References

External links

1983 births
Calgary Flames players
Calgary Flames draft picks
Finnish ice hockey centres
Kiekko-Vantaa players
Living people
Jokerit players
Ice hockey people from Helsinki
Omaha Ak-Sar-Ben Knights players
Quad City Flames players